Agamococcidiorida is an order within the subclass Coccidia of the phylum Apicomplexia. All members of this order are parasitic protozoa.

They are found in marine annelids.

Taxonomy

Two families are recognised in this order.

Life cycle
 
Both merogony and gametogony are absent in this order.

The oocysts contain sporocysts with two sporozoites each.

References

Apicomplexa orders
Conoidasida